These are the films directed, produced and distributed by the Thanhouser Company, the pioneering American motion picture studio of New Rochelle, New York.

1910

 The Actor's Children
 St. Elmo
 She's Done It Again
 Daddy's Double
 A 29-Cent Robbery
 The Old Shoe Came Back
 Her Battle for Existence
 Sand Man's Cure
 She Wanted to Marry a Hero
 The Cigars His Wife Bought
 Jane Eyre
 The Best Man Wins
 Cupid at the Circus
 The Winter's Tale
 The Girl of the Northern Woods
 The Two Roses
 The Writing on the Wall
 The Woman Hater
 The Little Hero of Holland
 Roosevelt's Return
 Thelma
 The Governor's Daughter
 Tempest and Sunshine
 The Flag of His Country
 Booming Business
 Gone to Coney Island
 The Girl Strike Leader
 The Lucky Shot
 The Converted Deacon
 The Girls of the Ghetto
 The Playwright's Love
 Uncle Tom's Cabin
 The Mermaid
 Jenks' Day Off
 The Restoration
 The Mad Hermit
 Lena Rivers
 The Girl Reporter
 She Stoops to Conquer
 A Dainty Politician
 The Latchkey
 An Assisted Elopement
 A Fresh Start
 Mother
 The Doctor's Carriage
 Tangled Lives
 The Stolen Invention
 Not Guilty
 The Convict
 The Hero's Jealous Wife
 Home Made Mince Pie
 Dots and Dashes
 Leon of the Table D'hote
 Avenged
 Pocahontas
 Delightful Dolly
 Oh, What a Knight!
 Alaska's Adieu to Winter
 Their Child
 Young Lord Stanley
 The Life of a Fireman
 Parade of the Volunteer Firemen of Westchester County and Vicinity
 The Fairies' Hallowe'en
 Mistress and Maid
 Ten Nights in a Bar Room
 The Little Fire Chief
 The American and the Queen
 Paul and Virginia
 The City of Her Dreams
 A Thanksgiving Surprise
 The Wild Flower and the Rose
 Value—Beyond Price
 John Halifax, Gentleman
 Rip Van Winkle
 The Girls He Left Behind Him
 The Iron Clad Lover
 Love and Law
 The Millionaire Milkman
 Looking Forward
 The Childhood of Jack Harkaway
 The Vicar of Wakefield
 Hypnotized

1911

 The Pasha's Daughter
 Baseball and Bloomers
 Everybody Saves Father
 The Only Girl in Camp
 The Vote That Counted
 Bertie's Brainstorm
 The Old Curiosity Shop
 When Love Was Blind
 Prompt Payment
 Stealing a Ride
 Only in the Way
 Adrift
 The Westerner and the Earl
 The Norwood Necklace
 For Her Sake
 Checkmate
 For Washington
 A Newsboy Hero
 The Little Mother
 Stage Struck
 The Mummy
 The Spirit Hand
 His Younger Brother
 Robert Emmet
 Divorce
 Waiting at the Church
 The Tramp
 The Impostor
 Silas Marner
 The Charity of the Poor
 Vindicated
 Velvet and Rags
 Old Home Week
 Cally's Comet
 Weighed in the Balance
 The Poet of The People
 An Elevator Romance
 The Pillars of Society
 The Sinner
 The Railroad Builder
 The Regimental Ball
 The Colonel and the King
 Lady Clare
 The Stage Child
 Get Rich Quick
 A War Time Wooing
 A Circus Stowaway
 The Stepmother
 Motoring
 The Rescue of Mr. Henpeck
 Little Old New York
 Flames and Fortune
 The Coffin Ship
 Foxy Grandma
 Courting Across the Court
 Lorna Doone
 The Declaration of Independence
 The Court's Decree
 When a Man Fears
 Won by Wireless
 That's Happiness
 Two Little Girls
 The Smuggler
 A Doll's House
 Pied Piper of Hamelin
 The Judge's Story
 Back to Nature
 Cupid the Conqueror
 Nobody Loves a Fat Woman
 The Train Despatcher
 The Cross
 The Romance of Lonely Island
 The Moth
 Romeo And Juliet, Part I
 Count Ivan and The Waitress
 Romeo and Juliet, Part II
 The Buddhist Priestess
 In the Chorus
 The Lie
 The Honeymooners
 Young Lochinvar
 Love's Sacrifice
 The Five Rose Sisters
 Austin Flood
 The East and the West
 The Higher Law
 The Tempter And Dan Cupid
 The Early Life of David Copperfield
 The Satyr and The Lady
 Little Em'ly and David Copperfield
 The Jewels of Allah
 The Loves of David Copperfield
 Their Burglar
 The Missing Heir
 The Last of the Mohicans
 The Higher the Fewer
 A Mother's Faith
 A Master of Millions
 The Baseball Bug
 The Tempest
 Beneath the Veil
 The Newsy and the Tramp
 Brother Bob's Baby
 The Lady from the Sea
 Deacon Debbs
 The Tomboy
 Cinderella
 She 
 The Expert's Report

1912

 The Passing
 A Columbus Day Conspiracy
 Just a Bad Kid
 The Twelfth Juror
 Dr. Jekyll and Mr. Hyde
 Her Ladyship's Page
 East Lynne
 As It Was in the Beginning
 On Probation
 The Trouble Maker
 The Signal Code
 The Silent Witness
 Surelock Jones, Detective
 Washington in Danger
 The Guilty Baby
 Extravagance
 His Great Uncle's Spirit
 Flying to Fortune
 The Poacher
 My Baby's Voice
 The Star of the Side Show
 Easy Mark
 The Crazy Quilt
 The Baby Bride
 When Mandy Came to Town
 The Cry of the Children
 Dora Thorne
 The Little Shut-In
 Jess—Part 1—A Sister's Sacrifice
 Jess—Part 3—Jess, the Avenger
 Dottie's New Doll
 Her Secret
 On the Stroke of Five
 Why Tom Signed the Pledge
 The Twins
 Called Back
 Farm And Flat
 In Blossom Time
 Old Bess
 The Professor's Son
 Doggie's Debut
 Out of the Dark
 Ma And Dad
 Under Two Flags
 Nursie and the Knight
 The Finger of Scorn
 Vengeance Is Mine
 The Ranchman and the Hungry Bird
 Only a Miller's Daughter
 The Portrait of Lady Anne
 The Merchant of Venice
 Cousins
 Treasure Trove
 A New Cure for Divorce
 One of the Honor Squad
 Baby Hands
 Old Dr. Judd
 Big Sister
 Now Watch the Professor!
 The Wrecked Taxi
 As Others See Us
 Warner's Waxworks
 Her Darkest Hour
 Conductor 786
 When a Count Counted
 Lucile—Parts 1 and 2
 Lucile—Part 3
 The Capture Of New York
 The Voice of Conscience
 His Father's Son
 Don't Pinch My Pup
 A Star Reborn
 Orator, Knight and Cow Charmer
 The Mail Clerk's Temptation
 Two Souls
 At the Foot of the Ladder
 Undine
 But the Greatest of These Is Charity
 Please Help the Pore
 Letters of a Lifetime
 The Warning
 A Six Cylinder Elopement
 Miss Robinson Crusoe
 Specimens from The New York Zoological Park
 Dotty, the Dancer
 When Mercy Tempers Justice
 The Woman in White
 In a Garden
 Mary's Goat
 Taking Care of Baby
 Put Yourself in His Place
 The Little Girl Next Door
 Petticoat Camp
 The Ladder of Life
 Through The Flames
 The Noise Like a Fortune
 The County's Prize Baby
 In Time of Peril
 Frankfurters and Quail
 Cross Your Heart
 The Truant's Doom
 The Thunderbolt
 The Forest Rose
 Standing Room Only
 A Will and a Way
 A Romance of the U.S.N.
 At Liberty—Good Press Agent
 Aurora Floyd
 Brains vs. Brawn
 The Other Half
 The Race
 The Repeater
 The Star of Bethlehem
 A Militant Suffragette
 With the Mounted Police

1913

 A Poor Relation
 A Guilty Conscience
 The Boomerang
 The Evidence of the Film
 The City Mouse
 The Tiniest of Stars
 Napoleon's Luck Stone
 The Commuter's Cat
 Her Fireman
 The Floorwalker's Triumph
 Her Nephews from Labrador
 The Dove in the Eagle's Nest
 Psychology of Fear
 His Uncle's Wives
 When the Studio Burned
 While Mrs. Mc Fadden Looked Out
 Good Morning, Judge
 A Mystery of Wall Street
 The Two Sisters
 The Ghost in Uniform
 Sherlock Holmes Solves the Sign of the Four
 Inauguration Ceremonies
 Just a Shabby Doll
 Babies Prohibited
 The Heart of a Child
 The Wax Lady
 The Woman Who Did Not Care
 The Spoiled Darling's Doll
 When Ghost Meets Ghost
 The Patriot
 The Changeling
 The Dog in the Baggage Car
 The Girl and the Grafter
 Retribution
 The Children's Conspiracy
 An American in the Making
 For Another's Sin
 Priscilla's Pets
 Rosie's Revenge
 The Girl Detective's Ruse
 Express C.O.D.
 Barred from the Mails
 Marble Heart
 Why Babe Left Home
 A Business Woman
 In Their Hour of Need
 A Pullman Nightmare
 A Victim of Circumstances
 The Caged Bird
 The Runaway
 Miss Mischief
 While Baby Slept
 His Sacrifice
 The Head of the Ribbon Counter
 The Snare of Fate
 The Eye of Krishla
 Forgive Us Our Trespasses
 The Lost Combination
 A Modern Lochinvar
 King René's Daughter
 Her Two Jewels
 For the Man She Loved
 An Errand of Mercy
 A Crepe Bonnet
 Brethren of the Sacred Fish
 When Darkness Came
 The Op of New York
 The Wild Man Willie
 Little Dorrit
 In The Nick of Time
 Proposal by Proxy
 The 225th Anniversary of the Landing of the Huguenots at New Rochelle
 The Protectory's Oldest Boy
 The Girl of the Cabaret
 Oh! Such a Beautiful Ocean
 The Missing Witness
 The Lie That Failed
 Waiting for Hubby
 The Spirit of Envy
 The Medium's Nemesis
 An Unromantic Maiden
 The Ward of the King
 The Spartan Father
 Frazzled Finance
 Moths
 The Veteran Mounted Police Horse
 His Last Bet
 Taming Their Grandchildren
 The Message to Headquarters
 Redemption
 Flood Tide
 When The Worm Turned
 Robin Hood, Parts 1 and 2
 An Unfair Exchange
 The Official Goat Protector
 The Farmer's Daughters
 Life's Pathway
 Robin Hood, Parts 3 and 4
 The Twins and the Other Girl
 Louie, the Life Saver
 The Daughter Worth While
 The Plot Against the Governor
 The Final Game
 A Peaceful Victory
 Lobster Salad and Milk
 The Old Folks at Home
 The Silver-Tongued Orator
 Democratic Club Clambake
 How Filmy Won His Sweetheart
 Algy's Awful Auto
 The Twentieth Century Farmer
 The Junior Partner
 Friday, the Thirteenth
 Looking for Trouble
 The Campaign Manageress
 Bread Upon the Waters
 The Children's Hour
 He Couldn't Lose
 Baby's Joy Ride
 The Clothes Line Quarrel
 A Shot Gun Cupid
 Their Great Big Beautiful Doll
 The Blight of Wealth
 Curfew Shall Not Ring Tonight
 Her Right to Happiness
 The Henpecked Hod Carrier
 The Legend of Provence
 The Problem Love Solved
 The Little Church Around the Corner
 What Might Have Been
 The Milkman's Revenge
 A Beauty Parlor Graduate
 His Imaginary Family
 Uncle's Namesakes
 Lawyer, Dog and Baby
 Peggy's Invitation
 The Bush Leaguer's Dream
 Jack And The Beanstalk
 The Law of Humanity
 An Orphan's Romance
 Cupid's Lieutenant
 His Father's Wife
 The Head Waiter
 An Amateur Animal Trainer

1914

 Frou Frou
 A Rural Free Delivery Romance
 Their Golden Wedding
 Mrs. Pinkhurst's Proxy
 A Circumstantial Nurse
 The Runaway Princess
 Two Little Dromios
 Adrift in a Great City
 Coals of Fire
 When the Cat Came Back
 Turkey Trot Town
 Her Love Letters
 An Elusive Diamond
 The Vacant Chair
 The Elevator Man
 The Woman Pays
 The Loser Wins
 Joseph in the Land of Egypt
 Why Reginald Reformed
 Twins and a Stepmother
 The Success of Selfishness
 When Paths Diverged
 Percy's First Holiday
 The Dancer
 The Tangled Cat
 The Skating Master
 A Leak in the Foreign Office
 All's Well That Ends Well
 A Can of Baked Beans
 The Golden Cross
 The Hold-Up
 Their Best Friend
 Cardinal Richelieu's Ward
 The Scientist's Doll
 The Desert Tribesman
 A Seminary Consumed by Flames
 Her Way
 Guilty or Not Guilty
 Kathleen, the Irish Rose
 Billy's Ruse
 The Eugenic Boy
 The Cat's Paw
 The Grand Passion
 Their Cousin From England
 The Miser's Reversion
 Beautiful Snow
 When Sorrow Fades
 Repentance
 Dope
 Her First Lesson
 The Tin Soldier and the Dolls
 A Debut in the Secret Service
 Too Much Turkey
 An Hour Of Youth
 The Musician's Daughter
 Her Awakening
 The Infant Heart Snatcher
 The Strike
 His Reward
 When Algy Froze Up
 The Strategy of Conductor 786
 From the Flames
 Politeness Pays
 Getting Rid Of Algy
 A Woman's Loyalty
 Forced To Be Stylish
 Lost—A Union Suit
 A Mohammedan Conspiracy
 In Her Sleep
 The Somnambulist
 A Dog of Flanders
 A Circus Romance
 Algy's Alibi
 Pamela Congreve
 Was She Right in Forgiving Him?
 The Legend of Snow White
 A Telephone Strategy
 When The Wheels of Justice Clogged
 Out of the Shadows
 His Enemy
 The Scrub Lady
 Beating Back
 Rivalry
 The Toy Shop
 The Girl Across the Hall
 Remorse
 The Little Senorita
 The Man Without Fear
 The Outlaw's Nemesis
 For Her Child
 Professor Snaith
 The Widow's Mite
 The Harlow Handicap
 The Decoy
 The Cooked Goose
 Deborah
 The Girl of the Seasons
 The Leaven of Good
 The Substitute
 A Gentleman for a Day
 The Veteran's Sword
 Harry's Waterloo
 The Protean Play
 The Pendulum of Fate
 From Wash to Washington
 The Messenger of Death
 The Target of Destiny
 The Butterfly Bug
 The Guiding Hand
 Her Duty
 The Tell-Tale Scar
 Stronger Than Death
 In Peril's Path
 A Rural Romance
 Her Big Brother
 Mc Carn Plays Fate
 The Belle of the School
 Dog's Good Deed
 Conscience
 The Keeper of the Light
 Arty the Artist
 A Mother's Choice
 His Winning Way
 Little Mischief
 Jean of the Wilderness
 In Danger's Hour
 Sis
 The Emperor's Spy
 Gold
 The Master Hand
 The Mettle of a Man
 Varsity Race
 The Final Test
 The Harvest of Regrets
 The Trail of the Love-Lorn
 The Balance of Power
 A Dog's Love
 The Cripple
 The Benevolence of Conductor 786
 Lizards of the Desert
 The One Who Cared
 The Rescue
 The Diamond of Disaster
 One Little Touch
 The Touch of a Little Hand
 Left in the Train
 Old Jackson's Girl
 The Face at the Window
 Mr. Cinderella
 A Madonna of the Poor
 The Dead Line
 Shep's Race with Death
 The Turning of the Road
 When Vice Shuddered
 Keeping a Husband
 The Terror of Anger
 The Chasm
 Seeds of Jealousy
 The Man with the Hoe
 Pawns of Fate
 A Bum Mistake
 A Messenger of Gladness
 Nature's Celebrities
 Good Fellowship
 Mrs. Van Ruyter's Stratagem
 The Wild, Wooly West
 The Center of the Web
 The Reator of "Hunger”
 Naidra, the Dream Woman
 The Amateur Detective
 The Reader of Minds
 In The Conservatory
 The Barrier of Flames
 Shadows and Sunshine
 Sid Nee's Finish
 Under False Colors
 The White Rose
 A Hatful of Trouble
 Lucy's Elopement

1915

 Shep the Sentinel
 When Fate Rebelled
 The Bridal Bouquet
 Her Menacing Past
 Check No. 130
 An Inside Tip
 The Speed King
 Pleasing Uncle
 Graft vs. Love
 An Innocent Burglar
 The Dog Catcher's Bride
 The Finger Prints of Fate
 The Home of Silence
 The Volunteer Fireman
 Helen Intervenes
 In the Jury Room
 Nellie's Strategy
 The Shoplifter
 The Smuggled Diamond
 Across the Way
 Gratitude of Conductor 786
 A Man of Iron
 Who Got Stung?
 His Sister's Kiddies
 The Adventure of Florence
 $1,000 Reward
 On Account of a Dog
 A Newspaper Nemesis
 On the Brink of the Abyss
 And He Never Knew
 The Mishaps of Marceline
 The Final Reckoning
 Do Unto Others
 Little Bobby
 The Master's Model
 Joe Harkins' Ward
 The Stolen Jewels
 The Duel in the Dark
 Jealousy
 The Skinflint
 The Spirit of Uplift
 The Magnet of Destruction
 The Schemers
 The Life Worth While
 The Cycle of Hatred
 Just Kids
 A Double Exposure
 The Moment of Sacrifice
 The Actor and the Rube
 Big Brother Bill
 The Undertow
 The Handicap of Beauty
 The Reformation of Peter and Paul
 Fashion and the Simple Life
 Bianca Forgets
 Movie Fans
 Their One Love
 The Last Concert
 Monsieur Nikola Dupree
 A Scientific Mother
 Love and Money
 The Song of the Heart
 Ferdie Fink's Flirtations
 The Three Roses
 The Heart of the Princess Marsari
 God's Witness
 The House that Jack Moved
 The Refugee
 Daughter of Kings
 Fairy Fern Seed
 It's an Ill Wind
 The Angel in the Mask
 The Baby Benefactor
 The Girl of the Sea
 Truly Rural Types
 A Freight Car Honeymoon
 The Patriot and the Spy
 The Six-Cent Loaf
 His Guardian Auto
 Bud Blossom
 Through Edith's Looking Glass
 The Country Girl
 Ebenezer Explains
 In the Valley
 Little Herman
 The Two Cent Mystery
 Which Shall It Be?
 The Stolen Anthurium
 Innocence at Monte Carlo
 Crossed Wires
 The Flying Twins
 The Silent Co-Ed
 Fifty Years After Appomattox
 A Maker of Guns
 Mme. Blanche, Beauty Doctor
 Tracked Through the Snow
 Mercy on a Crutch
 Dot on the Day Line Boat
 His I.O.U.
 Old Jane of the Gaiety
 The Picture of Dorian Gray
 P. Henry Jenkins and Mars
 His Two Patients
 Outcasts of Society
 Milestones of Life
 Getting the Gardener's Goat
 The Game
 When the Fleet Sailed
 A Plugged Nickel
 The Revenge of the Steeple-Jack
 Cupid in the Olden Time
 A Message Through Flames
 Gussie, the Graceful Life Guard
 Weighed in the Balance
 The Crogmere Ruby
 The Marvelous Marathoner
 When Hungry Hamlet Fled
 Help! Help!
 In a Japanese Garden
 Glorianna's Getaway
 Snapshots
 M. Lecoq
 That Poor Damp Cow
 The Vagabonds
 A Massive Movie Mermaid
 Reincarnation
 Biddy Brady's Birthday
 From the River's Depths
 Pansy's Prison Pies
 The Bowl-Bearer
 The Mother of Her Dreams
 Weary Walker's Woes
 Out of the Sea
 Superstitious Sammy
 Helen's Babies
 Bessie's Bachelor Boobs
 The Twins of the G.L. Ranch
 Simon's Swimming Soul Mate
 The Dead Man's Keys
 Con, the Car Conductor
 A Disciple of Nietzsche
 The Miracle
 Gustav Gebhardt's Gutter Band
 The Road To Fame
 A Perplexing Pickle Puzzle
 The Price of Her Silence
 The Mystery of Eagle's Cliff
 Cousin Clara's Cook Book
 The Light on the Reef
 Dicky's Demon Dachshund
 The Has Been
 Capers of College Chaps
 Down on the Phony Farm
 The Scoop at Bellville
 Bing-Bang Brothers
 The Long Arm of the Secret Service
 John T. Rocks and the Flivver
 Busted but Benevolent
 The Spirit of Audubon
 Hattie, the Hair Heiress
 At the Patrician Club
 Tillie, the Terrible Typist
 The Conscience of Juror No. 10
 His Wife
 The Soap Suds Star
 The Fisherwoman
 Freddie, the Fake Fisherwoman
 The Commuted Sentence
 "Clarissa's" Charming Calf
 Seventh Noon
 Mr. Meeson's Will
 The Mistake of Mammy Lou
 Lulu's Lost Lotharios
 The Little Captain of the Scouts
 The Film Favorite's Finish
 In Baby's Garden
 Hannah's Hen-Pecked Husband
 In the Hands of the Enemy
 A Cunning Canal-Boat Cupid
 Inspiration
 Beneath the Coat of a Butler
 The Postmaster of Pineapple Plains
 The Baby and the Boss
 The Villainous Vegetable Vender
 The Valkyrie
 All Aboard
 Foiling Father's Foes
 The Crimson Sabre
 Checking Charlie's Child
 The House Party at Carson Manor
 Minnie, the Mean Manicurist
 His Vocation
 Clarence Cheats at Croquet
 Her Confession
 The Conductor's Classy Champion
 An Innocent Traitor
 Bill Bunks the Bandits
 The Mill on the Floss
 His Majesty, the King
 The Necklace of Pearls
 The Political Pull of John
 When William's Whiskers Worked
 Ambition
 Toodles, Tom and Trouble
 Una's Useful Uncle
 Their Last Performance
 Foolish Fat Flora

1916

 The Optimistic Oriental Occults
 The Bubbles in the Glass
 Big Gun Making
 Hilda's Husky Helper
 Belinda's Bridal Breakfast
 In the Name of the Law
 Reforming Rubbering Rosie
 The Woman in Politics
 Grace's Gorgeous Gowns
 The Phantom Witness
 The Five Faults of Flo
 Pete's Persian Princess
 Lucky Larry's Lady Love
 The Burglars' Picnic
 Beaten at the Bath
 Betrayed
 A Clever Collie's Comeback
 The Knotted Cord
 Harry's Happy Honeymoon
 Booming the Boxing Business
 The Spirit of the Game
 Snow Storm and Sunshine
 Outwitted
 Silas Marner
 Ruth's Remarkable Reception
 The Reunion
 The Oval Diamond
 Rusty Reggie's Record
 Jungle Life in South America
 Oscar, the Oyster Opener
 The Flight of the Duchess
 The Whispered Word
 A Bird of Prey
 Pansy Post, Protean Player
 The Fifth Ace
 Pedro, the Punk Poet
 Fear
 The Snow Shoveler's Sweetheart
 The Net
 Oh! Oh! Oh! Henery!
 The Traffic Cop
 Sapville's Stalwart Son
 Romance of the Hollow Tree
 Overworked Oversea Overseer
 The Girl from Chicago
 The Man's Sin
 Master Shakespeare, Strolling Player
 Simple Simon's Schooling
 A Man Of Honor
 The Carriage of Death
 Willing Wendy to Willie
 Dashing Druggist's Dilemma
 The Weakling
 The Spirit of '61
 The Skilful Sleigher's Strategy
 When She Played Broadway
 Freddie's Frigid Finish
 Deteckters
 The Answer
 Steven's Sweet Sisters
 Politickers
 For Uncle Sam's Navy
 Disguisers
 Other People's Money
 Peterson's Pitiful Plight
 Advertisementers
 John Brewster's Wife
 Where Wives Win
 Romeoers
 The Window of Dreams
 The Fugitive
 Fare, Lady
 Getting the Grafters
 The Shine Girl
 The Swiss Sea Dog
 The Fear of Poverty
 The Heart of a Doll
 A Flaw in the Evidence
 Saint, Devil and Woman
 Arabella's Prince
 The Pillory
 At the Edge of the Aqueduct
 Prudence the Pirate
 Hidden Valley
 The World and the Woman
 Pamela's Past
 Divorce and the Daughter
 King Lear

1917

 Her New York
 A Modern Monte Cristo
 Her Life and His
 The Vicar of Wakefield
 Her Beloved Enemy
 Pots and Pans Peggie
 Mary Lawson's Secret
 When Love Was Blind
 The Woman and the Beast
 Hinton's Double
 The Candy Girl
 An Amateur Orphan
 Fires of Youth
 The Unfortunate Marriage
 The Woman in White
 It Happened to Adele
 The Man Without a Country
 War and the Woman
 Under False Colors
 The Heart of Ezra Greer

References

 Thanhouser Film Corporation - IMDB filmography

 
Lists of films by studio
Silent films

Articles containing video clips